Neringa or Neringa Municipality is a municipality of Klaipėda County in westernmost Lithuania, comprising several villages in the Curonian Spit. In terms of population, it is the smallest municipality of the country.

Name
The name of the city is relatively new and is not found in old scriptures in this form. The name is derived from a German word Neringe, Nerunge, Nehrung which itself is a derivative of a curonian word nerija meaning a long peninsular spit.

Until the 2000 Lithuanian municipality reform, it was known as Neringa City, although there was never a true "city" there. It was made a city in the Soviet Union in 1961 by formally combining 4 settlements into one administrative unit.

Geography
Neringa is located south of Klaipėda, separated from the mainland Lithuania by Curonian Lagoon. It is accessible from the mainland Lithuania by ferry crossing the lagoon or overland through Kaliningrad Oblast, Russia.

The villages in Neringa municipality comprise:
the self-governing resort town (kurortas) of Nida, seat of the local administration
the eldership (seniūnija) of Juodkrantė
the eldership of Preila and Pervalka.

They are tourist resorts and by then it was popular to grant more self-government to resorts.
The municipality is the only one in Lithuania which is not called after a town or city. The name Neringa was created at Soviet time for the new city municipality.

History

Neringa belonged to the former south-curonian landscapes Pilsaten and Lamotina.

Since 1252 the region was under the rule of the Teutonic Knights. In 1454, Polish King Casimir IV Jagiellon incorporated the region to the Kingdom of Poland upon the request of the anti-Teutonic Prussian Confederation. After the subsequent Thirteen Years' War (1454–1466), it was a part of Poland as a fief held by the Teutonic Knights, and thus was located within the Polish–Lithuanian union, later elevated into the Polish–Lithuanian Commonwealth. From the 18th century it was part of the Kingdom of Prussia, and from 1871 it was also part of Germany. Already in 1569 a "confusion of languages" was noticed: German, Lithuanian, Latvian-Curonian (Nehrungs-Kurisch) and Prussian. Nehrungs-kurisch was the language of the fishers.

The colours of the typical houses are handed down from the pagan religion and symbolize Divinities: Earth (brown), Sky and Water (blue), Clouds and Spray (white). At the top two crossed "zirgs" (horse heads).

The census of 1897 showed that about 60% used the Curonian language, on sea even 65%. In 1923, when sovereignty over the spit came to Lithuania, the inhabitants had problems with their nationality. Only few opted for Lithuania, many emigrated to Germany and others stayed as German "resident foreigners" in their villages. The result of the census of 1956: 59% Lithuanians, 21% Russians and only 15% (22 families) of the autochtone inhabitants.

Coat of arms
The Coat of Arms from the year 1968 shows the black and white symbols of the Klaipėda Region,
Kurenwimpel, Nida, Preila, Pervalka, Juodkrantė, Purvinė. The N stands for the new name.

Literature
 Arūnė Arbušauskaitė. Einige Aspekte der nationalen Selbsteinschätzung bei der altansässigen Bevölkerung der Kurischen Nehrung nach 1945, in Annaberger Annalen 1994

References

External links

 :de:Kurenwimpel 
 Annaberger Annalen 
 Neringa on Litauen Netz 
 Neringa.tel - Mobile directory with basic information about Neringa 
 NeringaTour - Neringa Town Virtual Guide 
 NeringaTours - Tours, Taxi, TukTuk in Neringa 
 Captain Taxi - Taxi services in Neringa 

Cities in Lithuania
Cities in Klaipėda County
Municipalities of Klaipėda County
Lithuania Minor
 
Municipalities of Lithuania